Donald L. Montgomery (July 23, 1931–December 7, 2020) was an American politician who spent three terms in the Kansas State Senate, serving from 1981 to 1992.

References

1931 births
2020 deaths
Kansas Republicans
20th-century American politicians
People from Sabetha, Kansas
Republican Party Kansas state senators